Hugh Cholmondeley may refer to:
 Hugh Cholmondeley (soldier) (1513–1596), English soldier
 Hugh Cholmondeley (priest) (1770–1825), Dean of Chester Cathedral 1806–1815
 Hugh Cholmondeley, 1st Earl of Cholmondeley (1662–1725), British peer and politician
 Hugh Cholmondeley, 2nd Baron Delamere (1811–1887), British peer and politician
 Hugh Cholmondeley, 3rd Baron Delamere (1870–1931), British settler in Kenya
 Hugh Cholmondeley, 6th Marquess of Cholmondeley (1919–1990), British peer
 Hugh Cholmondeley, 5th Baron Delamere (born 1934), British peer

See also 
 Hugh Cholmeley (disambiguation)